Festoon Falls is a waterfall on Saddle-tree Creek, a tributary of the Burnet River, in Queensland, Australia. The waterfall is located within the Bunya Mountains National Park, in the South Burnett Region, near the village of Dandabah in the Bunya Mountains. Like other waterfalls in the area, Festoon Falls is surrounded by dense bush and pine forest.

Access
The falls are easily accessed by a  maintained walking track from Dandabah; the track is unsuitable for wheelchairs and bicycles, but is quite easy on foot.

See also
 List of waterfalls of Australia

References

Waterfalls of Queensland
South Burnett Region